Ghakhar Mandi is a city in the Gujranwala District of Pakistan, located between Wazirabad to the northwest and Gujranwala to the southeast. It is central to 33 villages, and the home of Pakistan's second-largest electrical grid.

Ghakhar Mandi is famous for its hand made industry and floor mats. It is also known for the production of rice, and wheat. It is also home to a historic railway station. Asia's oldest road, the Grand Trunk Road, which was built nearly 500 years ago by Sher Shah Suri passes through this city.

Notable people

Muhammad Rafiq Tarar, former President of Pakistan.
Qamar Javed Bajwa, Chief of Army Staff of Pakistan Army.
Nassar Ikram, Admiral in Pakistan Navy

References

Cities and towns in Gujranwala District